Anthony Sutton may refer to:

Antony C. Sutton (1925–2002), British-born economist, historian and writer
Tony Sutton (born 1967), current chairman of the Republican Party of Minnesota